Vrona may refer to:

 Vrona, Oklahoma, former name of Nicut, Oklahoma
 Ivan Vrona (1887–1970), Ukrainian artist

See also
 
 Wrona